Oberderdingen is a municipality in the district of Karlsruhe, in Baden-Württemberg, Germany. It is situated 30 km east of Karlsruhe and 32 km west of Heilbronn.

References

Karlsruhe (district)